I camionisti (The Truckers) is a 1982 Italian comedy film directed by Flavio Mogherini and starred by the comedy duo Gigi e Andrea.

Plot 
Ofelia, the handsome operator of a service station, attracts the attentions of several admirers, including her former lover Rocky, a truck driver, and the noble Sir Archibald.

Cast 

 Andrea Roncato as Rocky
 Gigi Sammarchi as Rocky's Colleague
 Daniela Poggi as  Ofelia Cecconi
 Francisco Cecilio as  Sir Archibald 
 Giorgio Bracardi as  Driver of Sir Archibald 
 Sergio Leonardi as  Chiavica
 Toni Ucci

See also
 List of Italian films of 1982

References

External links

1982 films
1980s buddy comedy films
Films scored by Riz Ortolani
Films directed by Flavio Mogherini
Italian buddy comedy films
Trucker films
1982 comedy films
1980s Italian-language films
1980s Italian films